Take Your Chance is the debut studio album by German recording artist Alexander Klaws. It was released by Sony BMG on Hansa Records on 8 April 2003 in German-speaking Europe, following his win of the debut season of Deutschland sucht den Superstar in 2003.

Track listing

Charts

Weekly charts

Year-end charts

Certifications

References

2003 debut albums
Alexander Klaws albums
Hansa Records albums